Hamburg-Wandsbek is an electoral constituency (German: Wahlkreis) represented in the Bundestag. It elects one member via first-past-the-post voting. Under the current constituency numbering system, it is designated as constituency 22. It is located in northeastern Hamburg, comprising the southern part of the Wandsbek borough.

Hamburg-Wandsbek was created for the inaugural 1949 federal election. Since 2013, it has been represented by Aydan Özoğuz of the Social Democratic Party (SPD).

Geography
Hamburg-Wandsbek is located in northeastern Hamburg. As of the 2021 federal election, it comprises the southern part of the Wandsbek borough, specifically the quarters of Bramfeld, Eilbek, Farmsen-Berne, Jenfeld, Marienthal, Rahlstedt, Steilshoop, Tonndorf, Volksdorf, and Wandsbek.

History
Hamburg-Wandsbek was created in 1949, then known as Hamburg V. In the 1949 election, it was Hamburg constituency 5. From 1953 through 1961, it was constituency 19; in the 1965 election it became constituency 17. In 1965 it was also renamed to Wandsbek, and acquired its current name in the 1976 election. In the 2002 through 2009 elections, it was constituency 23. It has been number 22 since the 2013 election.

Originally, the constituency comprised the entirety of Wandsbek borough without the quarter of Eilbek. From the 1965 election, the quarters of Marienthal, Jenfeld, and Tonndorf were transferred away from it. In the 1972 election, the quarter of Bramfeld was transferred away, but returned in the 1980 election. At the same time, it lost the quarters of Lemsahl-Mellingstedt, Duvenstedt, Wohldorf-Ohlstedt, and Bergstedt. In the 2002 election, the quarters of Marienthal, Jenfeld, and Tonndorf were returned. In the 2017 election, the constituency gained the quarter of Eilbek.

Members
The constituency has been held by the Social Democratic Party (SPD) during all but two Bundestag terms since 1949; it returned a representative from the SPD in every federal election from 1957 through 2005. Its first representative was Irma Keilhack of the SPD, who served from 1949 to 1953. The German Party (DP) candidate Albert Walter won the constituency in 1953 and served for a single term. Former member Keilhack won it back in 1957, and served until 1965. Ilse Elsner served two terms from 1965 to 1972, followed by Alfons Pawelczyk until 1980. Eugen Glombig served a single term from 1980 to 1983. Peter Zumkley was representative from then until 2002. He was succeeded by former mayor of Hamburg Ortwin Runde. The constituency was won by the Christian Democratic Union (CDU)'s Jürgen Klimke in 2009, but returned to the SPD's Aydan Özoguz in 2013. She was re-elected in 2017 and 2021.

Election results

2021 election

2017 election

2013 election

2009 election

References

Federal electoral districts in Hamburg
1949 establishments in West Germany
Constituencies established in 1949
Wandsbek